Daniel George McKenzie (June 24, 1860 – February 4, 1940) was a farmer and political figure in Nova Scotia, Canada. He represented Cumberland County in the Nova Scotia House of Assembly from 1920 to 1933 as a United Farmers and then Liberal-Conservative member.

He was born in Malagash, Nova Scotia, the son of Donald McKenzie. McKenzie was married twice: to Mary McKenzie in 1884 and then to Julia Cameron. McKenzie served as Speaker of the House of Assembly of Nova Scotia from 1929 to 1933. He was party leader for the United Farmers of Nova Scotia and leader of the opposition in 1920. McKenzie died in Malagash at the age of 79.

References 
 A Directory of the Members of the Legislative Assembly of Nova Scotia, 1758-1958, Public Archives of Nova Scotia (1958)

1860 births
1940 deaths
Progressive Conservative Association of Nova Scotia MLAs
Speakers of the Nova Scotia House of Assembly